The Danube Pilot is a novel by Jules Verne.

It was first published in 1908, three years after his death, and like most of the books published posthumously, had been extensively revised by his son, Michel. Part of the Voyages Extraordinaires series, it recounts the adventures of the lead character, Serge Ladko, a prize winner in the Danubian League of Amateur Fishermen, as he travels down the river. Jules' original title for this story was "Le Beau Danube Jaune". The original novel was published by Jules Verne Society (Société Jules Verne) in 1988.

References
The Danube Pilot

Bibliography
 Verne, Jules. The Danube Pilot (The Fitzroy Edition). Associated Booksellers, 1970. 190 pages.

External links 
 

1908 French novels
Novels by Jules Verne
Novels published posthumously